Jean-Claude Beaulieu (born 24 June 1944 in Payroux) is a member of the National Assembly of France.   He represents the Charente-Maritime department, and is a member of the Union for a Popular Movement.

References

1944 births
Living people
People from Vienne
Union for a Popular Movement politicians
Deputies of the 12th National Assembly of the French Fifth Republic